The 1998 Iowa Hawkeyes football team represented the University of Iowa in the 1998 NCAA Division I-A football season. They played their home games at Kinnick Stadium and participated as members of the Big Ten Conference. The 1998 season marked the 20th and final season for coach Hayden Fry.

Schedule

Roster

Game summaries

Central Michigan

Source: Box Score

Iowa State

Source: Box Score

at Arizona

Source: Box Score

at Illinois

Source: Box Score and Game Story

Tim Douglas kicked three field goals from beyond 50 yards, including a school-record 58-yard field goal.

Michigan

Source: Box Score

Northwestern

Source: Box Score

at Indiana

Source: Box Score

Wisconsin

Source: Box Score

Purdue

Source: Box Score

Ohio State

Source: Box Score

Minnesota

Source: Box Score

Postseason awards
Jared DeVries - Consensus First-team All-American (Defensive Tackle)

Team players in the 1999 NFL draft

References

Iowa
Iowa Hawkeyes football seasons
Iowa Hawkeyes football